The Latino Commission on AIDS is an advocacy and service nonprofit membership organization formed in 1990 with a mission to combat the spread of HIV/AIDS in the Latino community in the United States of America including its territories. It is known for coordinating the National Latino AIDS Awareness Day.

References

External links 
 , English language landing page of Latino Commission on AIDS

HIV/AIDS organizations in the United States
Hispanic and Latino American organizations
Health in Puerto Rico
Health in the United States Virgin Islands
1990 establishments in the United States
Organizations established in 1990